Local area emergency (SAME code: LAE) is an advisory issued by local authorities through the Emergency Alert System (EAS) in the United States to notify the public of an event that does not pose a significant threat to public safety and/or property by itself, but could escalate, contribute to other more serious events, or disrupt critical public safety services. Instructions, other than public protective actions, may be provided. Examples include: a disruption in water, electric or natural gas service, road closures due to excessive snowfall, or a potential terrorist threat where the public is asked to remain alert.

Example
URGENT - IMMEDIATE BROADCAST REQUESTED
LOCAL AREA EMERGENCY
TENNESSEE EMERGENCY MANAGEMENT AGENCY NASHVILLE TN
RELAYED BY NATIONAL WEATHER SERVICE HUNTSVILLE AL
1259 PM CDT SAT SEP 21 2013

...LOCAL AREA EMERGENCY FOR LINCOLN AND MOORE COUNTIES...

THE FOLLOWING MESSAGE IS TRANSMITTED AT THE REQUEST OF THE
TENNESSEE EMERGENCY MANAGEMENT AGENCY NASHVILLE TN.

DUCK RIVER ELECTRIC CUSTOMERS WILL BE WITHOUT POWER FOR ABOUT 4 HOURS
BEGINNING 12 AM ON SUNDAY SEPTEMBER 22ND. THE OUTAGE WILL AFFECT ALL
OF MOORE COUNTY AND PART OF LINCOLN COUNTY AROUND BOONEVILLE. THE
OUTAGE WILL ALLOW DUCK RIVER AND TVA TO PERFORM SYSTEM MAINTENANCE.

IF YOU RELY ON MEDICAL EQUIPMENT DEPENDENT ON ELECTRICITY, HAVE A
PLAN TO MAINTAIN USE OF YOUR EQUIPMENT DURING THE OUTAGE. CHARGE
YOUR CELL PHONES. CORDLESS PHONES WILL NOT WORK DURING THE POWER
OUTAGE. UNPLUG COMPUTER, TELEVISIONS, AND SENSITIVE ELECTRONICS.
NOTIFY YOUR HOME SECURITY COMPANY. KNOW HOW TO MANUALLY OPERATE
GARAGE DOORS AND ELECTRIC GATES. MINIMIZE OPENING REFRIGERATOR AND
FREEZER DOORS DURING THE OUTAGE. IF YOU HAVE A GENERATOR, MAKE SURE
IT HAS BEEN INSTALLED PROPERLY. CHECK TO MAKE SURE ALL HEAT
PRODUCING APPLIANCES SUCH AS STOVES, TOASTER OVENS, AND IRONS ARE
TURNED OFF. IF ELECTRICITY IS REQUIRED TO RUN YOUR WATER OR TO REFILL
YOUR TOILET FOR FLUSHING, HAVE A RESERVE OF WATER ON HAND PRIOR TO
THE PLANNED POWER OUTAGE. NEVER USE A GAS RANGE, INDOOR COOKER,
CHARCOAL OR GAS BARBEQUE FOR HEATING. CALL 911 IF YOU HAVE AN
EMERGENCY.

References 

 http://www.srh.noaa.gov/bro/?n=mapcolors
 http://www.srh.noaa.gov/lub/?n=nonweathercemdescriptions

Emergency Alert System
National Weather Service
Warning systems